Chersotis fimbriola is a moth of the family Noctuidae. It is found in number of isolated populations from Austria to Spain, Morocco, Turkey, Iraq, Iran and Turkmenistan.

Description
Warren (1914) states R. fimbriola Esp. (= maravigna Dup.) Forewing dark greyish ochreous, often much suffused with fuscous; stigmata of the ground colour, often indistinct, the upper two always separated by a fuscous black blotch forming part of a thick median shade; submarginal line preceded by a blackish shade; the raddei. marginal area fuscous; hindwing fuscous brown. — The ground colour of ab. raddei Chr. (13 f) is paler and brighter, the dark suffusion less, and the markings clearer; the underside likewise much paler. — A south European species, found in France, Spain, N. Italy, Switzerland, and Hungary; occurring also in Western
Asia, in Armenia, Asia Minor, Syria, Persia and W. Turkestan, these Asiatic examples being usually the form raddei. Larva dark brownish grey; dorsal and subdorsal lines paler: between them on each segment two oblique black streaks; similar streaks also between the subdorsal and the conspicuous dark lateral lines; thoracic plate brown with 3 white streaks; head shining brown; on a variety of low-growing plants.

Subspecies
Chersotis fimbriola fimbriola (Austria, Hungary)
Chersotis fimbriola baloghi (northern Hungary, southern Slovakia)
Chersotis fimbriola vallensis (Wallis (Piemont), Alpes-Maritimes)
Chersotis fimbriola hackeri (south-eastern France)
Chersotis fimbriola iberica (Spain)
Chersotis fimbriola iminenia (the High Atlas in Morocco)
Chersotis fimbriola rifensis (Middle Atlas and Rif in Morocco)
Chersotis fimbriola maravignae (Sicily)
Chersotis fimbriola forsteri (Yugoslavia, Bulgaria, Greece)
Chersotis fimbriola bohatschi (Turkey, Armenia)
Chersotis fimbriola zernyi (southern Turkey, Israel, Iraq, south-eastern Iran)
Chersotis fimbriola raddei (northern Iran, eastern Armenia, Turkmenistan)

Biology
Adults are on wing from June to August. There is one generation per year.

The larvae feed on various herbaceous plants.

References

External links
 Noctuinae of Israel

Noctuinae
Moths of Europe
Moths of Asia
Moths of Africa